Dowlatabad (also Romanized as Dowlatābād; also known as Daūlatābād) is a village in Dowlatabad Rural District, in the Central District of Ravansar County, Kermanshah Province, Iran. At the 2006 census, its population was 398, in 104 families.

References 

Populated places in Ravansar County